Kleines Wiesental is a municipality in the district of Lörrach in Baden-Württemberg, southwestern Germany. It was formed on 1 January 2009 by the merger of the former municipalities Bürchau, Elbenschwand, Neuenweg, Raich, Sallneck, Tegernau, Wies and Wieslet.

References

Lörrach (district)
Baden